The 1982 African Championships in Athletics were held in Cairo, Egypt between 25 and 28 August.

Medal summary

Men's events

Women's events

Medal table

See also
1982 in athletics (track and field)

External links
Results – GBR Athletics

A
African Championships in Athletics
A
African
African Championships in Athletics
1980s in Cairo
Sports competitions in Cairo
Athletics in Cairo
August 1982 sports events in Africa